The Acraeini are a tribe of butterflies of the subfamily Heliconiinae in the family Nymphalidae.

Genera
The recognized genera are:
 Abananote Potts, 1943
 Acraea Fabricius, 1807 – acraeas
 Actinote Hübner, [1819] – actinotes
 Altinote Potts, 1943 – altinotes
 Bematistes Hemming, 1935
Cethosia (Fabricius, 1807) – lacewings
 Miyana (Fruhstorfer, 1914)

The genus Acraea is highly paraphyletic and needs to be redelimited. This will possibly re-establish the old genus Telchinia, and perhaps others.

The genus Pardopsis Trimen, 1887, previously included in Acraeini, has tentatively been moved to the Argynnini tribe.

References

External links

 

Taxa named by Jean Baptiste Boisduval
Butterfly tribes